Connected may refer to:

Film and television
 Connected (2008 film), a Hong Kong remake of the American movie Cellular
 Connected: An Autoblogography About Love, Death & Technology, a 2011 documentary film
 Connected (2015 TV series), an AOL On documentary web series
 Connected (2020 TV series), a Netflix documentary series
 Sportsnet Connected, a sports news program that airs in Canada
 The Mitchells vs. the Machines, a 2021 American animated comedy film previously named Connected
 Connected (2022 film), first film produced by Star Magic Studios

Music

Albums
 Connected (Eivind Aarset album), 2004
 Connected (The Foreign Exchange album), 2004
 Connected (Lil' Flip and Mr. Capone-E album), 2006
 Connected (Stereo MCs album), 1992

Songs
 "Connected" (Ayumi Hamasaki song), 2003
 "Connected" (Hoobastank song), 2004
 "Connected" (RBD song), 2006
 "Connected" (Stereo MCs song), 1992

Other uses
 Connected space, a mathematical concept in topology
 Path-connected space
 Simply connected space
 Connected ring, a concept from commutative algebra
 ConnectEd, a plan to provide high-speed Internet service to nearly all United States schools
Connected (website), The Arts Society (UK) platform to support isolated people during coronavirus pandemic

See also
 Connect (disambiguation)
 Connectivity (disambiguation)
 Connection (disambiguation)
 Connexion (disambiguation)
 Reconnected (disambiguation)